The GT42CU AC is a model of diesel electric locomotives manufactured by EDi Rail, Maryborough between 1999 and 2005 under licence from Electro-Motive Diesel, for use on narrow gauge railways in Queensland.

History
In March 1998, Queensland Rail ordered 38 GT42CU ACs from Clyde Engineering. They were the first locomotives ordered from Clyde Engineering after its takeover by Evans Deakin Industries and were built at the latter's Maryborough factory.

Designated the 4000 class, the first was delivered in October 1999. After an extensive evaluation process, the first entered service in May 2000 with all in service by May 2001. The dramatic increase in tractive effort and adhesion of the AC traction motors compared to the previous DC traction motors exceeded all expectations and revolutionised diesel operations in Queensland. A further 11 were ordered in March 2003 and entered service in 2004–05.

They are primarily used on the Blackwater and Moura coal networks, and on phosphate trains between Mount Isa and Townsville. All were included in the transfer of Queensland Rail's freight business to QR National in July 2010.

In February 2004, Pacific National ordered 13 GT42CU ACs to commence operations in Queensland. Designated the PN class, they entered service in 2005 and are used on intermodal services on the North Coast line between Brisbane and Cairns.

The design evolved into the GT42CU ACe which has different computer system and traction motors.

Fleet

Related Development
 UGL Rail C44aci, standard gauge competitor
 Downer EDI Rail GT46C, standard gauge variant
 Downer EDI Rail GT46C ACe, standard gauge successor
 Downer EDI Rail GT42CU ACe, successor

References

Aurizon diesel locomotives
Diesel locomotives of Queensland
Pacific National diesel locomotives
Queensland Rail locomotives
Railway locomotives introduced in 1999
3 ft 6 in gauge locomotives of Australia
Diesel-electric locomotives of Australia